Maungakaramea is a locality in Northland, New Zealand. Whangārei is to the northeast.

Local features include Tangihua Forest, Maungakaramea Sports Club and Mid Western Rugby Club.

History and culture

The name Maungakaramea was given to the area by local Māori. There are two interpretations of the meaning of the name, one is that "Karamea" means speargrass (Aciphylla), hence the "speargrass mountain", the other is that Karamea is a coloured clay of a reddish type used for war paint on the face and body. A safe interpretation is "Red Ochre Mountain".

The area from Whangarei to Waipu,  Waihonga and Tangihua, was taken from Ngaitahuhu by a Ngapuhi chief, Te Ponaharakeke, who joined with Te Ngarokiteuru to drive all the Ngaitahuhu out in the mid-18th century.

The first record of a European settler in the Maungakaramea area was in 1820 when the Reverend Samuel Marsden encountered a Māori tribe whilst travelling overland via the Kaipara Harbour.

The Maungakaramea blocks were purchased by the government in 1855.

The Eastern part of the Maungakaramea Block (now part of Mangapai) was opened for sale in April 1857, but the area now considered Maungakaramea was not open to selection until May 1859.

Amongst the early settlers were two brothers, Henry Spear Wilson and Daniel Cook Wilson. Also, Jonathan Wigmore Sherlock and his wife Ann arrived in 1859 from Ireland, and took out land orders for 78 acres, being Lots 59 and 60, on 2 May 1859 – the first day this area was open for selection.

The local Maungārongo Marae and meeting house are a traditional meeting place for the Ngāpuhi hapū of Ngāti Hine, Ngāti Te Rino, Te Parawhau and Te Uriroroi.

Demographics
Maungakaramea is in two SA1 statistical areas which cover . The SA1 areas are part of the larger Oakleigh-Mangapai statistical area.

Maungakaramea had a population of 243 at the 2018 New Zealand census, a decrease of 30 people (−11.0%) since the 2013 census, and a decrease of 18 people (−6.9%) since the 2006 census. There were 114 households, comprising 123 males and 120 females, giving a sex ratio of 1.02 males per female, with 36 people (14.8%) aged under 15 years, 36 (14.8%) aged 15 to 29, 102 (42.0%) aged 30 to 64, and 75 (30.9%) aged 65 or older.

Ethnicities were 88.9% European/Pākehā, 21.0% Māori, and 2.5% Asian. People may identify with more than one ethnicity.

Although some people chose not to answer the census's question about religious affiliation, 59.3% had no religion, and 34.6% were Christian.

Of those at least 15 years old, 18 (8.7%) people had a bachelor's or higher degree, and 36 (17.4%) people had no formal qualifications. 27 people (13.0%) earned over $70,000 compared to 17.2% nationally. The employment status of those at least 15 was that 75 (36.2%) people were employed full-time, 33 (15.9%) were part-time, and 9 (4.3%) were unemployed.

Oakleigh-Mangapai statistical area

Oakleigh-Mangapai had a population of 2,310 at the 2018 New Zealand census, an increase of 105 people (4.8%) since the 2013 census, and an increase of 303 people (15.1%) since the 2006 census. There were 879 households, comprising 1,155 males and 1,158 females, giving a sex ratio of 1.0 males per female. The median age was 44.1 years (compared with 37.4 years nationally), with 444 people (19.2%) aged under 15 years, 345 (14.9%) aged 15 to 29, 1,182 (51.2%) aged 30 to 64, and 339 (14.7%) aged 65 or older.

Ethnicities were 90.0% European/Pākehā, 18.7% Māori, 2.2% Pacific peoples, 1.6% Asian, and 2.1% other ethnicities. People may identify with more than one ethnicity.

The percentage of people born overseas was 14.5, compared with 27.1% nationally.

Although some people chose not to answer the census's question about religious affiliation, 64.7% had no religion, 24.7% were Christian, 0.1% were Hindu, 0.4% were Buddhist and 1.9% had other religions.

Of those at least 15 years old, 270 (14.5%) people had a bachelor's or higher degree, and 363 (19.5%) people had no formal qualifications. The median income was $32,300, compared with $31,800 nationally. 291 people (15.6%) earned over $70,000 compared to 17.2% nationally. The employment status of those at least 15 was that 987 (52.9%) people were employed full-time, 339 (18.2%) were part-time, and 51 (2.7%) were unemployed.

Education

Maungakaramea School is a coeducational full primary (years 1-8) school with a roll of  students as of  The school celebrated its 125th reunion in 2000.

Geology

Notes

Whangarei District
Populated places in the Northland Region